Bryndza (from Romanian brânză cheese) is a sheep milk cheese made across much of East-Central Europe, primarily in or around the Carpathian Mountains of Romania, Moldova. Bryndza cheese is creamy white in appearance, known for its characteristic strong smell and taste. The cheese is white, tangy, crumbly and slightly moist. It has characteristic odor and flavor with a notable taste of butyric acid. The overall flavor sensation begins slightly mild, then goes strong and finally fades to a salty finish. Recipes differ slightly across countries.

Etymology
Bryndza or Brynza, a word borrowed from Romanian brânză ("cheese"), is used in various European countries, due to its introduction by migrating Vlachs. Though the word brânză is simply the generic word for "cheese" in Romanian, there is no special type of cheese associated with it (the name of the animal is added to differentiate Brânză de vaci). It is a word presumably inherited by the Romanian language from Dacian, the language of the pre-Roman population in modern-day Romania. Alternatively it was possibly borrowed from Albanian brëndës (“intestines”). Originally it referred to cheeses prepared in a sheep's stomach by reacting with the rennet inside. Outside Slovakia, Romania and the flanking regions of southern Poland, it is still popular nowadays in the Czech Republic under the Czech spelling "brynza". According to the Romanian Explanatory Dictionary the etymology of ”brânză” is unknown.

Other regional names for the product include juhtúró in Hungarian, брынза in Russian, brenca in Serbian, Brimsen in German, бринза and бринзя in Ukrainian and ברינזע in Yiddish.

History
The word was first recorded as brençe, described as "Vlach cheese", in the Croatian port of Dubrovnik in 1370. Bryndza was first recorded in the Kingdom of Hungary in 1470 and in the adjacent Polish region of Podhale in 1527.
In Slovakia, bryndza is regarded as a typically Slovak product and it is one of the main ingredients in the national dish bryndzové halušky. The modern version of the soft spreadable bryndza is believed to have been developed by entrepreneurs from Stará Turá (Western Slovakia) toward the end of the 18th century. They founded bryndza manufactures in mountainous regions of Central and Northern Slovakia, where local sheep cheese manufacturing had deep roots. They traded bryndza and popularized it all around the Austrian Habsburg monarchy. In Austria, it was called Liptauer, after the northern Slovak Liptov region. The Viennese speciality Liptauer, a savoury cheese-based spread, has replaced bryndza with common cows' milk cottage cheese because the original Slovak bryndza disappeared from Austrian market after the Dissolution of Austria-Hungary.

Geographical indications
 Slovak bryndza from Slovakia was registered in the EU's Register of protected designations of origin and protected geographical indications on 16 July 2008 as a Protected Geographical Indication (PGI). The geographical indication was requested on 4 October 2007. Slovak bryndza must contain at least 50% of sheep milk. Sheep (ovčia) bryndza contains 100% sheep cheese.
 Bryndza Podhalańska from Poland has been registered in the EU's Register of protected designations of origin and protected geographical indications on 11 June 2007 as a Protected Designation of Origin (PDO). The geographical indication was requested on 23 September 2006.

See also
 Brânză de burduf from Romania, made from caș
 Austrian Liptauer
 Bulgarian Sirene
 Greek Feta
 Italian Ricotta
 Mexican Queso fresco
 List of cheeses

References

Further reading
 

Brined cheeses
Slovak cheeses
Romanian cheeses
Polish cheeses
Ukrainian cheeses
Sheep's-milk cheeses